The Nobel Prize is a set of five different prizes that, according to its benefactor Alfred Nobel, in his 1895 will, must be awarded "to those who, during the preceding year, have conferred the greatest benefit to humankind”. The five prizes are awarded in the fields of Physics, Chemistry, Physiology or Medicine, Literature, and Peace.

Since 1901, the year wherein the awarding of the prizes began, a number of women have been considered and nominated carefully in each field. The first woman to win a Nobel Prize was Marie Curie, who won the Nobel Prize in Physics in 1903 with her husband, Pierre Curie, and Henri Becquerel. Curie is also the only woman to have won multiple Nobel Prizes; in 1911, she won the Nobel Prize in Chemistry. Curie's daughter, Irène Joliot-Curie, won the Nobel Prize in Chemistry in 1935, making the two the only mother-daughter pair to have won Nobel Prizes.

In 1922, Cécile Vogt-Mugnier became the first women nominated for prize in physiology or medicine but never won. She was followed by Maud Slye who was nominated in the year 1923, but again never won. Only in 1947, that the Nobel Prize in Physiology or Medicine was finally awarded to a woman, Gerty Cori, sharing with her husband Carl Ferdinand Cori.

The most number of female nominees was in the field of literature. The first woman to be nominated was the German memoirist Malwida von Meysenbug for the year 1901. She was nominated by the French historian Gabriel Monod but unfortunately she did not win the prize. Her nomination was followed by Émilie Lerou and Selma Lagerlöf for the year 1904. Lagerlöf would later on become the first woman to win the prize in the year 1909.

Physics
Starting from 1902 to 1970, 10 women have been nominated for the Nobel Prize in Physics and three of the nominees were subsequently awarded.

Chemistry
Starting 1911 to 1970, 15 women have been nominated for the Nobel Prize in Chemistry and 3 of these nominees were subsequently awarded.

Physiology or Medicine
Starting from 1922 to 1953, 13 women have been nominated for the Nobel Prize in Physiology or Medicine and one of the nominees was subsequently awarded.

Literature
From 1901 to 1972, 75 women have been nominated for the Nobel Prize in Literature and 8 of these nominees were subsequently awarded.

Peace
From 1901 to 1973, 56 women have been nominated for the Nobel Peace Prize and five of these nominees were subsequently awarded.

Motivations

See also
 List of Nobel laureates
 List of female Nobel laureates
 List of women writers
 List of women's rights activists
 List of female scientists in the 20th century
 List of female nominators for the Nobel Prize
 Matilda effect

References

External links

Nobel
Female
Nobel
Nobel Prize